Effingham County is located in the south central part of the U.S. state Illinois. As of the 2020 census, the population was 34,668. Its county seat and largest city is Effingham.
Some other cities in Effingham County, Illinois include Altamont, Teutopolis, Beecher City, Montrose, Dieterich, Shumway, Watson, Mason, and Edgewood. Effingham County comprises the Effingham, IL Micropolitan Statistical Area.

History

Effingham County was formed in 1831 out of Fayette and Crawford counties. It may have been named after Thomas Howard, 3rd Earl of Effingham, who resigned his commission as general in the British army in 1775, refusing to serve in the war against the Colonies. The name is Anglo-Saxon for "Effa's house".  New information suggests that the county was named after a surveyor who surveyed the area whose last name was Effingham.  There is no written proof that the county was named after Lord Effingham.

Geography

Just west of Effingham on Interstate 70 there is a  white cross; 35,000 vehicles are estimated to pass the site each day.

Climate and weather

Adjacent counties
 Cumberland County - northeast
 Jasper County - east
 Clay County - south
 Fayette County - west
 Shelby County - northwest

Major highways
  Interstate 57
  Interstate 70
  U.S. Route 40
  U.S. Route 45
  Illinois Route 32
  Illinois Route 33
  Illinois Route 37
  Illinois Route 128

Transit
 Effingham station
 List of intercity bus stops in Illinois

Demographics

As of the 2010 United States Census, there were 34,242 people, 13,515 households, and 9,302 families residing in the county. The racial makeup of the county was 97.6% white, 0.4% Asian, 0.2% black or African American, 0.1% American Indian, 0.8% from other races, and 0.8% from two or more races. Those of Hispanic or Latino origin made up 1.7% of the population. In terms of ancestry, 41.6% were German, 10.0% were Irish, 9.3% were American, and 8.8% were English.

Of the 13,515 households, 32.7% had children under the age of 18 living with them, 54.9% were married couples living together, 9.5% had a female householder with no husband present, 31.2% were non-families, and 26.9% of all households were made up of individuals. The average household size was 2.50 and the average family size was 3.03. The median age was 39.2 years.

The median income for a household in the county was $49,509 and the median income for a family was $61,373. Males had a median income of $40,951 versus $28,209 for females. The per capita income for the county was $24,843. About 7.8% of families and 10.5% of the population were below the poverty line, including 14.1% of those under age 18 and 7.4% of those age 65 or over.

Communities

Cities
 Altamont
 Effingham (seat)

Town
 Mason

Villages
 Beecher City
 Dieterich
 Edgewood
 Montrose
 Shumway
 Teutopolis
 Watson

Townships
Effingham County is divided into fifteen townships:

 Banner
 Bishop
 Douglas
 Jackson
 Liberty
 Lucas
 Mason
 Moccasin
 Mound
 St. Francis
 Summit
 Teutopolis
 Union
 Watson
 West

Unincorporated Communities
 Dexter
 Elliottstown
 Funkhouser
 Gilmore
 Heartville
 Moccasin

Politics
In its early years Effingham County was owing to its anti-Civil War German-American population powerfully Democratic. Until Woodrow Wilson’s harsh policies towards Germany following World War I drove many voters to the GOP’s Warren G. Harding, it had voted an absolute majority to the Democratic presidential candidate in every election since the county’s formation. Opposition to the New Deal caused a considerable swing away from Franklin D. Roosevelt in 1936, and combined with local opposition to Roosevelt’s war policies in 1940 to cause FDR to only win the county by forty-seven votes from Wendell Willkie.

Since that election, the county has voted Republican in every election except 1948 and 1964, and no Democrat since Jimmy Carter in 1976 has reached 35 percent of the county’s vote. Currently Effingham County is one of Illinois’ most Republican counties, rivalled by a number of southern counties like Edwards. In the 2008 U.S. Presidential election, John McCain carried the county by a 36% margin over Barack Obama, making it McCain's strongest county in the state, with Obama carrying his home state by a 25.1% margin over McCain.

See also
 National Register of Historic Places listings in Effingham County, Illinois

References
Specific

General
 History of Southern Illinois, George Washington Smith, 1912.
 United States Census Bureau 2007 TIGER/Line Shapefiles
 United States Board on Geographic Names (GNIS)
 United States National Atlas

External links
 Effingham County History & Genealogy

 
Illinois counties
1831 establishments in Illinois
Populated places established in 1831